Fegen is a lake and nature reserve in Sweden. The lake is situated in the traditional provinces (landskap in Swedish) Halland, Småland and Västergötland. Their boundaries meet approximately in the middle of the lake.

The village Fegen is located on the south side of the lake, the village Sandvik on the northeast side.

Nature reserve
The nature reserve was established in 1980.

References

Nature reserves in Halland County